Undetharaya is the legendary leader of the Kunchitiga community people in the state of Karnataka, India. He is even today worshipped by the Kunchitiga people as a demigod along with Jaladhi Bapparaya.

Legend
Legend has it that Kunchitiga were living near by delli in the Middle Ages. Undetharaya was their leader. around 12th century a local Muslim Nawab was committing atrocities on them. Once he took away the eldest daughter of undetharaya and wanted to take away his younger daughter as well. Undetharaya unable to fight the nawab, instead decided to leave the place for the safety of his people and take them south to the present day districts of Tumkur and Chitradurga in Karnataka.

Kuruba Saviour
While on their trek south, undetharaya and his people had to first cross the Krishna River and took the help of the persons belonging to "Nayaka" and "Dombara" community. As they moved further south they came across the overflowing Tungabhadra river and was helped by a Kuruba called "Jaladhi Bapparaya" to cross the river on the promise that he would name the community after him. Jaladhi Bapparaya was holding a Kuncha(cluster) used to weave woolen blankets in his hands, a symbol of his profession. Undeyetharaya named his community as Kunchitiga in honour of him. The one who was holding a Kuncha. Undetharaya also gave his other surviving daughter in marriage to Jaladhi Bapparaya, heralding the start of a new community.

History of Karnataka
Indian legends